Plone are an electronic music band from Birmingham, England.

Career
Plone formed in late 1994 when Mark Cancellara and Mike Johnston started to buy old analogue keyboards and guitar effects units, and began to rehearse and make soundscapes under the name Rehab. Johnston was living with Billy Bainbridge (who was in another band at the time, Supernal, also containing members of electro band sol dat) who bought himself a keyboard and joined the band, changing their name to Plone.

The band started gigging as support to local bands such as Pram and Broadcast. In 1997, the band was approached by Wurlitzer Jukebox who released the single, "Press a Key".  On the strength of this the band was signed to Warp and, in September 1998, released the single "plock". This was tipped as one of the singles of the year by NME, Melody Maker and Dazed & Confused.

An album For Beginner Piano was released in September 1999 to widespread critical acclaim.

Rob Mitchell (who had originally signed the band to Warp) was diagnosed with cancer in 2001 and died in September that year.

Their second album has never been officially released but has appeared on torrent and other file sharing sites on the internet.

Bainbridge went on to play keyboards with Broadcast (on the 'Ha Ha Sound' tour), and is now a member of Seeland with Tim Felton (now also ex-Broadcast), and released a single "Wander" / "Pherox" on Duophonic in 2005. Johnston went on to form Mike in Mono, and is also 'Clive 2' in ZX Spectrum Orchestra and a member of the Modified Toy Orchestra.

Mark Cancellara is currently a magician's assistant and DJ.

Starting in the summer of 2009, Plone's song "Plaything" appeared on a Reese's Peanut Butter Cups commercial.

In October 2019, it was announced that Bainbridge and Johnston has reconvened as Plone and that a new album will be released on the Ghost Box label in 2020. On 25 February 2020 the new album was announced, named Puzzlewood and set to be released on 17 April. It is compiled from material recorded at various points since the “lost second album”, right up to the present day.

Band members
Mike 'Billy' Bainbridge
Michael Johnston

Discography

Singles
"Press A Key" (Wurlitzer Jukebox)
"Plock" (Warp Records)

Albums
For Beginner Piano (Warp Records)(1999)
Untitled second album - never released
Puzzlewood (Ghost Box Records)(2020)

Remixes
Warp 10+3 (2xCD) "Tricky Disco (Plone Remix)" (Warp Records)
"Me And Jerry D" / "On Furry Cushion (Plone Mix)" (7") "On Furry Cushion (Plone Mix)" (Octave Kitten Recordings)
Somniloquy (CD) "Bewitched (Plone Mix)" (Domino Recording Company Ltd.)

Tracks appeared on
wap100. We Are Reasonable People (CD) "Plaything" (Warp Records)
Round Squared: Weirdbag Vol. 1 (CD) "Somebody Is Alive And Well... Somewhere" (Round Records)
For Wearing A Phone W/Q (CD) "Simple Song" (not on a label)
The Mediterranean Beat Cook (Cassette) "Sunday Laid Moo" (Spotlight Records, Japan)
Music Sampler (CD) "Plock", "Top & Low Rent" (Warp Records)

References

External links
Plone
For Beginner Piano at the Warp Records website
"Plock" at the Warp Records website
Plone interviewed in 1997
Mike Johnston in Mono fan blog
Mike Johnston in Mono page at warmcircuit
BBC interview with Mike Johnston
Seeland on Duophonic

English electronic music groups
Intelligent dance musicians
Warp (record label) artists
Ghost Box Music artists
Matador Records artists
Musical groups from Birmingham, West Midlands